Brachypalpus oarus, the Eastern Catkin, is a common species of syrphid fly first officially described by Walker in 1849. Hoverflies get their names from the ability to remain nearly motionless while in flight. The adults are also known as flower flies for they are commonly found around and on flowers, from which they get both energy-giving nectar and protein-rich pollen. The larvae are of the rat-tailed type feeding on decaying sap under tree bark.

Distribution
Canada, United States.
This nearctic species is  located mostly in Northeastern North America, with a population in southwestern Canada.
 External image

References

Eristalinae
Insects described in 1849
Diptera of North America
Hoverflies of North America
Taxa named by Francis Walker (entomologist)